John Gold is a former American football punter. He was signed by the Seahawks as an undrafted free agent in 2011. He played college football at the University of Texas.

He is currently co-owner of Forty Acres Coffee, along with former University of Texas center Chris Hall.

Professional career
Gold was signed by the Seattle Seahawks as an undrafted free agent following the end of the NFL lockout in 2011.

External links
 Seattle Seahawks bio

Living people
American football punters
Texas Longhorns football players
Seattle Seahawks players
Players of American football from Texas
Year of birth missing (living people)